Romain Revelli (born 22 August 1977) is a French professional football manager and former player. He is the head coach of  club Dunkerque. As a player, he was a defensive midfielder.

Playing career 
A true "child of Les Verts", Revelli began his playing career at Saint-Étienne; he played for the club's B team from 1995 to 1998 before switching over to Le Puy for the three final years of his career. He voluntarily retired from football in 2001, before the age of 25, in order to become a football manager.

Managerial career 
After passing through Haute-Loire, Revelli became a youth team coach for Saint-Étienne in 2007. He initially worked as the manager of the under-17 squad, and later coached the under-19s of the club. In 2011, Revelli was called by Christophe Galtier, ASSE manager since 2009, to become his assistant. He subsequently held the position of assistant coach at Saint-Étienne for four years, being on the bench for over 100 Ligue 1 matches. In 2015, Revelli became the assistant manager of Ligue 2 club Évian. The following year, he became head coach, but only until the club's liquidation in 2016.

In 2017, Revelli returned to his home region, becoming the head coach of Andrézieux. He then would go on to coach Cholet from 2018 to 2019 before returning to Andrézieux. In May 2021, he was appointed as head coach by Ligue 2 club Dunkerque, signing a two-year contract.

Personal life 
Romain's brother Christophe was also a footballer. They played together at Saint-Étienne.

References

External links 
 

1977 births
Living people
People from Saint-Chamond
Sportspeople from Loire (department)
French footballers
Association football midfielders
AS Saint-Étienne players
Le Puy Foot 43 Auvergne players
French football managers
Thonon Evian Grand Genève F.C. managers
USL Dunkerque managers
Footballers from Auvergne-Rhône-Alpes